The Kobrinskaya narrow-gauge railway is located in Kirov Oblast, Russia.

Current status 
The Kobrinskaya forestry railway's first line was constructed in 1946, in the area of Murashinsky District, Kirov Oblast from the village Bezbozhnik. The railway operates scheduled freight services from Bezbozhnik, used for forestry tasks such as the transportation of felled logs and forestry workers. In 1992, as a result of privatization "Mayskiy timber industry enterprise", there was founded JSC "Mayskles" company. In 2014, repairs are being made to the track.

Rolling stock

Locomotives 
 TU4 – No. 0045, 2145
 TU6A – No. 3806, 2846, 2333, 2633, 3697, 3722, 3901, 3082, 3995, 3278, 3490
 TU7 – No. 2787, 2039, 2208, 2569, 2072, 2534
 TU6SPA – No. 0024
 TU6P – No. 0022
 TU8 – No. 0457
 TD-5U "Pioneer"

Railroad cars 
 Boxcar
 Tank car
 Snowplow
 Dining car
 Passenger car
 DM-20 "Fiskars"
 Side-tipping wagons
 Crane LT-110 – No. 018
 Railway log-car and flatcar
 Hopper car to transport track ballast

Work trains 
 Track machine DM-7
 Tamping machine LD-22-002
 Track UPS-1

Gallery

References and sources

See also
Narrow-gauge railways in Russia
List of Russian narrow-gauge railways rolling stock

External links

 Official website JSC "Mayskles" 

750 mm gauge railways in Russia
Railway lines opened in 1946
Logging railways in Russia
Rail transport in Kirov Oblast